John Francis Nogowski (born January 5, 1993) is an American professional baseball first baseman who is a free agent. He was drafted by the Oakland Athletics in the 34th round of the 2014 MLB draft. He made his Major League Baseball (MLB) debut for the St. Louis Cardinals in 2020, and has also played for the Pittsburgh Pirates.

Career

Oakland Athletics
Nogowski attended North Florida Christian School and played college baseball at Florida State University, batting .307/.431/.443 in 2014. He was drafted by the Oakland Athletics in the 34th round of the 2014 MLB draft. He spent the 2014 season with the AZL Athletics and the Vermont Lake Monsters, batting a combined .264/.351/.347. In 2015, he was assigned to the Stockton Ports, and batted .274/.352/.364. He would spend the entire 2015 season with Stockton. He played in Stockton and for the Midland RockHounds in 2016. Nogowski was released before the season started on March 27, 2017.

Sioux City Explorers
On May 18, 2017, Nogowski signed with the Sioux City Explorers of the American Association of Independent Professional Baseball. Nogowski played in 32 games for Sioux City, slashing .402/.482/.607.

St. Louis Cardinals
The St. Louis Cardinals purchased Nogowski’s contract on June 27, 2017. He would finish the 2017 season with the Double-A Springfield Cardinals. He would also spend most of the 2018 season with them, batting .309/.392/.463. He spent 2019 with the Triple-A Memphis Redbirds, batting .295/.413/.476 in 380 at bats while coming in third in the PCL with 69 walks and 10 hit-by-pitch, and tying for fourth by grounding into 15 double plays.

Nogowski was called up to the majors for the first time on August 15, 2020. He made his major league debut the next day against the Chicago White Sox and got his first major league hit off of Dallas Keuchel. In 2021, Nogowski made the Opening Day roster after batting .333 with two home runs over 33 spring training at-bats. Nogowski limped to a .056/.150/.056 slash line in 19 games with St. Louis before being designated for assignment on June 28, 2021.

Pittsburgh Pirates
On July 3, 2021, Nogowski was traded to the Pittsburgh Pirates in exchange for cash considerations. After hitting .261 with 1 home run and 14 RBI's through 33 games with the Pirates, he was designated for assignment on August 16, 2021. On August 20, Nogowski cleared waivers and was assigned outright to the Triple-A Indianapolis Indians. On September 20, the Pirates released Nogowski.

San Francisco Giants
On September 22, 2021, Nogowski signed a two-year minor league contract with the San Francisco Giants organization. Nogowski appeared in 8 games for the Triple-A Sacramento River Cats, hitting just .185/.290/.444 with 2 home runs and 5 RBI.

Atlanta Braves
On December 8, 2021, the Atlanta Braves selected Nogowski from the Giants in the minor league phase of the Rule 5 draft. He was released on June 16, 2022.

Washington Nationals
On June 22, 2022, Nogowski signed a minor league deal with the Washington Nationals. He elected free agency on November 10, 2022.

See also
Rule 5 draft results

References

External links

1993 births
Living people
Baseball players from Tallahassee, Florida
Major League Baseball first basemen
St. Louis Cardinals players
Pittsburgh Pirates players
Florida State Seminoles baseball players
Arizona League Athletics players
Vermont Lake Monsters players
Stockton Ports players
Midland RockHounds players
Springfield Cardinals players
Surprise Saguaros players
Sioux City Explorers players
Gulf Coast Cardinals players
Yaquis de Obregón players
American expatriate baseball players in Mexico
Memphis Redbirds players
Águilas Cibaeñas players
American expatriate baseball players in the Dominican Republic
Indianapolis Indians players